Babette Louisa Valerie Hobson (14 April 1917 – 13 November 1998) was a British actress whose film career spanned the 1930s to the early 1950s. Her second husband was John Profumo, a British government minister who became the subject of the Profumo affair in 1963.

Early years
Hobson was born at Sandy Bay, Larne, County Antrim, in Ulster. Her father, Robert Gordon Hobson (1877-1940), was a Commander in the Royal Navy, her mother was Violette (c. 1890-1955; née Hamilton-Willoughby).

Before she was 11 years old, Hobson had begun to study acting and dancing at the Royal Academy of Dramatic Arts.

Life and career
In 1935, aged 17, she appeared as Baroness Frankenstein in Bride of Frankenstein with Boris Karloff and Colin Clive. She played opposite Henry Hull that same year in Werewolf of London, the first Hollywood werewolf film. The latter half of the 1940s saw Hobson in perhaps her two most memorable roles: as the adult Estella in David Lean's adaptation of Great Expectations (1946), and as the refined and virtuous Edith D'Ascoyne in the black comedy Kind Hearts and Coronets (1949).

In 1952, she divorced her first husband, film producer Anthony Havelock-Allan (1904–2003). In 1954, she married Brigadier John Profumo (1915–2006), a Member of Parliament (MP), giving up acting shortly afterwards. Profumo was a prominent politician of Italian descent.

Hobson's last starring role was in the original London production of Rodgers and Hammerstein's musical play The King and I, which opened at the Theatre Royal, Drury Lane, on 8 October 1953. She played Mrs. Anna Leonowens opposite Herbert Lom's King. The show ran for 926 performances.

After Profumo's ministerial career ended in disgrace in 1963, following revelations he had lied to the House of Commons about his affair with Christine Keeler, Hobson stood by him, and they worked together for charity for the remainder of her life, though she did miss their more public personas.

Hobson's eldest son, Simon Anthony Clerveaux Havelock-Allan, was born in May 1944 with Down's syndrome, and died in January 1991. Her middle child, Mark Havelock-Allan, was born on 4 April 1951 and became a judge. Her youngest child is the author David Profumo (born 16 October 1955), who wrote Bringing the House Down: A Family Memoir (2006) about the scandal. In it, he writes his parents told him nothing of the scandal and that he learned of it from another boy at school.

After her death, Hobson's body was cremated in accordance with her wishes. Half her ashes were interred in the family vault in Hersham. The rest were scattered on 1 January 1999 by her sons David Profumo and Mark Havelock-Allan, near the family's farm in Scotland. Hobson was portrayed by Deborah Grant in the film Scandal (1989), by Joanna Riding in Andrew Lloyd Webber's stage musical Stephen Ward the Musical, which opened at the Aldwych Theatre on 19 December 2013, and by Emilia Fox in the BBC mini-series The Trial of Christine Keeler in 2019.

Filmography

 His Lordship (1932) – Last Face in Montage (uncredited)
 For Love of You (1933) – Minor Role (uncredited)
 Eyes of Fate (1933) – Rene
 The Path of Glory (1934) – Maria
 Two Hearts in Waltz Time (1934) – Susie
 Badger's Green (1934) – Molly Butler
 Great Expectations (1934) – Biddy (scenes deleted)
 Strange Wives (1934) – Mauna
 The Man Who Reclaimed His Head (1934) – Mimi – Carnival Girl (uncredited)
 Life Returns (1935) – Mrs. Kendrick
 The Mystery of Edwin Drood (1935) – Helena Landless
 Rendezvous at Midnight (1935) – Sandra Rogers
 Oh, What a Night (1935) – Susan
 Bride of Frankenstein (1935) – Elizabeth
 Werewolf of London (1935) – Lisa Glendon
 Chinatown Squad (1935) – Janet Baker
 The Great Impersonation (1935) – Eleanor Dominey
 August Weekend (1936) – Claire Barry
 The Secret of Stamboul (1936) – Tania
 Tugboat Princess (1936) – Sally
 No Escape (1936) – Laura Anstey
 Jump for Glory (1937) – Glory Howard aka Glory Fane
 The Drum (1938) – Mrs. Carruthers
 This Man Is News (1938) – Pat Drake
 Q Planes (1939) – Kay Hammond
 The Silent Battle (1939) – Draguisha
 This Man in Paris (1939) – Pat Drake
 The Spy in Black (1939) – The School Mistress
 Contraband (1940) – Mrs. Sorensen
 Atlantic Ferry (1941) – Mary Ann Morison
 Unpublished Story (1942) – Carol Bennett
 The Adventures of Tartu (1943, aka Sabotage Agent) – Maruschuka Lanova
 The Years Between (1946) – Diana Wentworth
 Great Expectations (1946, Hobson had also acted in the 1934 version, in the role of Biddy, but her scenes were cut.) – Estella
 Blanche Fury (1948) – Blanche Fury
 The Small Voice (1948) – Eleanor Byrne
 Kind Hearts and Coronets (1949) – Edith
 Train of Events (1949) – Stella (segment "The Composer")
 The Interrupted Journey (1949) – Carol North
 The Rocking Horse Winner (1950) – Hester Grahame
 The Card (1952) – Countess of Chell
 Who Goes There! (1952) – Alex Cornwall
 Meet Me Tonight (1952) – Stella Cartwright (segment "Ways and Means")
 The Voice of Merrill (1952) – Alycia
 Background (1953) – Barbie Lomax
 Knave of Hearts (1954) – Catherine Ripois (final film role)

References

External links

 
 
 
 Photographs of Valerie Hobson

1917 births
1998 deaths
British film actresses
People from Larne
20th-century British actresses
British comedy actresses
British expatriates in the United States